Alphonse Thys (8 March 1807 – 1 August 1879) was a 19th-century French composer.

Short biography
He studied harmony at the Conservatoire de Paris with Émile Bienaimé and composition with Henri-Montan Berton.

In 1833, he won the first Prix de Rome with his cantata Le Contrebandier espagnol. He lived two years at the Villa Medicis in Rome, then settled in Paris as a composer. He wrote some popular songs such as La Belle limonadière or La Nuit au sérail.

He wrote operas for the Théâtre national de l'Opéra-Comique as well as mixed choirs. When he was a teacher of music, he used Pierre Galin's method (the Galin-Paris-Chevé system), and in 1873 wrote the foreword of the book Histoire anécdotique de la méthode Galin-Paris-Chevé. His most famous pupil was Edmond de Polignac.

He was Pauline Thys's father.

Works
His abundant production includes:
 1835: Alda, opera in one act, with Jean-François Bayard and Paul Duport
 1839: Le Roi Margot, comédie à ariettes
 1841: L'Avantage d'être goujon !, bêtise aquatique in four couplets, lyrics by Justin Cabassol
 1842: La Discrète, lyrics by Émile Barateau
 1844: Oreste et Pylade, opéra comique in one act
 1844: Marquise et soubrette, mélodies, lyrics by Victor Mabille
 1844: Le Nuage !, mélodie, lyrics by Marc Constantin
 1845: L'Amazone, opéra comique in one act
 1846: Le Distrait, song, lyrics by Victor Mabille
 1848: La Sournoise, opéra comique in one act
 1849: Enfant n'y crois pas, lyrics by Henriette Chardonneau
 1849: La Famille, romance
 1850: Les Echos de Rosine, salon opera with piano, poem by Étienne Tréfeu
 1864: Les Plaisirs de la chasse, for male choir
 1864: Bonne Nuit, nocturne à deux voix, lyrics by Eugène Roch
 1873: 12 Fantaisies for oboe and piano
 6 Variations pour piano sur l'air de la Tyrolienne
 undated: La Muse comique, collection of ditties, songs, bawdy, pastoral, roundels, comic scenes, drinking songs and light songs with and without talking, for piano and voice, lyrics by Pierre-Antoine-Augustin de Piis, (with Étienne Arnaud, Amédée de Beauplan, François-Auguste Gevaert, Aristide Hignard, Paul de Kock, Adrien Lagard, Charles Lecocq, Sylvain Mangeant, Charles Pourny, Loïsa Puget, Victor Robillard and Jean-Pierre Solié.

Bibliography
 Clement Scott, Bernard Edward Joseph Capes, Charles Eglington, The Theatre, vol. 3, 1879, p. 118
 William Hayman Cummings, Biographical Dictionary of Musicians, 1892, p. 64
 Gustave Vapereau, Dictionnaire universel des contemporains, 1893
 T. J. Walsh, Second Empire Opera: The Théâtre Lyrique, Paris 1851–1870, 1981, p. 339
 Procès-verbaux de l'Académie des Beaux-arts: 1830–1834, 2004, p. 255

1807 births
1879 deaths
19th-century classical composers
Conservatoire de Paris alumni
French male classical composers
French opera composers
French Romantic composers
Musicians from Paris
19th-century French male musicians